Randa S. Ayoubi (born 1962) is the founder and CEO of Rubicon Group Holding, an international animation and digital media production company headquartered in Amman, Jordan. She has been recognised both as one of the most influential women in Global TV and as a significant Arab woman in business.

Background

Ayoubi was born in Jerusalem and raised in Amman. She holds a BSc in Computer Science an Executive MBA from Harvard Business School.

Ayoubi's inspiration reported came from a desire to amalgamate technology with education. She has spoken on wanting to bring Arabic media to a wider audience as part of an "Arabic Renaissance", stating that "The challenge is to produce more programmes so in the future children in Europe, the US or Asia might grow up watching Arabic shows dubbed in English, rather than the other way round."

Career 

In 1994, Ayoubi founded Rubicon, which became Rubicon Group Holding in 2004. She struggled initially to find funding from investors, but nonetheless began her company by training bankers in multi-media skills. After ten years of raising funds, Ayoubi turned to focus on animation and edutainment. Rubicon is now best known for its involvement in Ben & Izzy and the Postman Pat Movie. Ayoubi and Rubicon invested $1 billion in a theme park based on Tareq wa Shireen, one of the group's popular Arabic Cartoons.

Ayoubi is a founding member of the International Women Forum (IWF) Chapter in Jordan and serves on the board of Trustees at the King's Academy and Queen Rania Foundation for Education and Development. She has also served as on the board of trustees of the Royal Commission for Education Reform in Jordan, the Children Museum in Amman.

She has also held the position of Chairwoman of the Red Sea Institute of Cinematic Art in Aqaba and helped to found the Information Technology Association of Jordan.

Awards 

 YEA Entrepreneur of the Year Award - 2000
 Arabian Business Regional Entrepreneur Award - 2004
 CEO Middle East Awards Businesswoman of the Year Award - 2010
 Ernst and Young Entrepreneur of the Year Award - 2011

External links 

 Official Company biography

References 

1962 births
Women chief executives
Harvard Business School alumni
Living people
Jordanian businesspeople
Jordanian women in business